New Mexico True Television is an American educational and travel television series hosted by Michael Newman. The host travels to various parts of the state of New Mexico and shows the histories of attractions, people, and locations; all while he gives travel advice for potential tourists and imparts educational information for locals and regular visitors. It premiered on June 16, 2014 and is produced by Cliffdweller Productions. The show is funded by the New Mexico Tourism Department, as part of the state's broader New Mexico True tourism campaign. It is currently syndicated in New Mexico and Texas, on KOB, KFOX-TV, KLCW-TV.

Episodes

Season 1

Season 2

Season 3

Season 4

Season 5

Awards and reception
To date the show has won three consecutive regional Emmy Awards in the 2016, 2017, and 2018 Rocky Mountain division, for the “Magazine Program – Program/Special“ category.

References

External links

Production website

American travel television series
English-language television shows
2014 American television series debuts